The Barefoot Woman is a 2008 memoir by Scholastique Mukasonga, published by Éditions Gallimard. It was translated into English by Jordan Stump and released in that language in 2018, with publication by Penguin Random House.

The book concerns Mukasonga's mother. It has some discussion of the Rwandan genocide.

Parul Sehgul of The New York Times wrote that in comparison to Cockroaches, The Barefoot Woman is "gentler, in some ways" and that its "gaze [...] is softer".

Contents
The book lists Mukasonga's memories based on various topics.

Reception
Sehgul stated that The Barefoot Woman "powerfully continues the tradition of women’s work it so lovingly recounts."

Publishers Weekly described it as "beautiful and elegiac", and strongly recommended the book as it gave it a star.

References

External links
 The Barefoot Woman - Penguin Random House
 La femme aux pieds nus - Éditions Gallimard 

2008 non-fiction books
French memoirs
Books about Rwanda